Mickaël Diakota (born 6 October 1990) is a French professional footballer who most recently played for Gaz Metan Mediaș as a midfielder.

Club career
Diakota was a member of the AS Nancy youth academy since 2007, and begun his career in the lower divisions of France. He helped Luzenac AP win promotion into the Ligue 2 in 2014, but the authorities denied their promotion. He went to SR Colmar in 2015, but tore his achilles tendon leaving him out of action for seven months.

Diakota joined AS Béziers in 2017 and helped them get promoted into the Ligue 2. He made his professional debut in a 2–0 Ligue 2 win over his childhood club AS Nancy.

On 6 July 2019, Diakota signed a two-year contract with Liga I club Gaz Metan Mediaș.

International career
Diakota made one appearance for the France U20s in a 1–1 friendly tie with the Senegal U20s on 28 September 2009.

Career statistics

1 Including Coupe de France and Coupe de la Ligue.

References

External links
 
 
 
 Foot National Profile
 

Living people
1990 births
Footballers from Paris
Association football midfielders
French footballers
France youth international footballers
French sportspeople of Democratic Republic of the Congo descent
AS Béziers (2007) players
US Raon-l'Étape players
SR Colmar players
Luzenac AP players
CS Gaz Metan Mediaș players
Ligue 2 players
Championnat National players
Championnat National 2 players
Liga I players
French expatriate footballers
French expatriate sportspeople in Romania
Expatriate footballers in Romania
Black French sportspeople